Silla Q'asa (Quechua silla gravel, q'asa mountain pass, "gravel pass", also spelled Sillajasa) is a mountain in the Andes of Peru, about  high. It is located in the Ayacucho Region, Lucanas Province, Chipao District. Silla Q'asa lies between Uqi in the west and Puka Punchu in the east and southeast, northeast of a lake named Upaqucha.

References

Mountains of Peru
Mountains of Ayacucho Region